Bailleulval is a commune in the Pas-de-Calais department in the Hauts-de-France region of France.

Geography
A farming village located 9 miles (14 km) southwest of Arras on the D1 road.
The small river Crinchon passes through the commune. Canadian forces were billetted here during World War I.
9th (Service) Battalion Devonshire Regiment also billeted here during WW1. 19 August 1917 was Battalion Sports Day.

Population

Sights
 The church of St. Martin, dating from the eighteenth century.
 The vestiges of a 13th-century castle.
 British graves from World War I.

See also
Communes of the Pas-de-Calais department

References

External links

 CWGC graves at Bailleulval

Communes of Pas-de-Calais